Grégoire Barrère and Albano Olivetti were the defending champions but lost in the first round to Ruben Bemelmans and Daniel Masur.

Bemelmans and Masur won the title after defeating Brandon Nakashima and Hunter Reese 6–2, 6–1 in the final.

This event was the second edition of the Open Quimper Bretagne in 2021 after the Open d'Orléans was delayed due to the COVID-19 pandemic in France.

Seeds

Draw

References

External links
 Main draw

Open Quimper Bretagne II - Doubles
2021 Doubles